Paradox psychology is a counter-intuitive approach that is primarily geared toward addressing treatment resistance. The method of paradoxical interventions (pdxi) is more focused, rapid, and effective than Motivational Interviewing. In addressing resistance, the method seeks to influence the clients' underlying attitude and perception by providing laser beam attention on strengthening the attachment-alliance. This is counter-intuitive to traditional methods since change is usually directed toward various aspects of behavior, emotions, and thinking. As it turns out, the better therapy is able to strengthen the alliance, the more these aspects of behavior will change. 

However, within the pdxi process, the idea of changing behavior is secondary to the main focus on the alliance. In surprising fashion, this seemingly minor shift actually results in a 'day and night' difference in how treatment is conducted. The advantage of focusing on attachment=alliance is that when done correctly, the client cannot block or defend against the intervention. Basically, 'resistance' becomes non-existent. So while the resistant client is often well defended and guarded around attempts to alter his behavior, he is unable to block the therapist from strengthening the alliance.  This allows the clinician to avoid power struggles around behavior. By developing a stronger client-therapist bold, there is  a natural and unconscious shift toward relaxation. As a result, this allows the client to let go of rigid patterns in a manner that can best be described as spontaneous (as unlikely as that may initially sound!)

Description
PDXI is an approach that specifically addresses treatment of the "difficult" or resistant client, and a scientific understanding that supports a process for 'spontaneous change'. It unifies behavioral, cognitive, and psychodynamic orientations under a single umbrella theory and is a science-based model showing how treating secondary (less problematic) behaviors (i.e.: anger, low self-esteem, poor social skills, etc.) will then impact primary targeted volatile or criminal type behaviors (i.e.: violence, problematic sexual behaviours, fire-setting, etc.)

In addition, paradox psychology helps explain the process of paradoxical interventions. In doing so, the approach represents the logical extension of attachment theory as described by John Bowlby and Ainsworth.

While there are many treatment theories that address separate aspects of behavior, emotions, and thinking, this approach focuses on the obvious fact that human existence is a 'paradox'. This paradox is evidenced by the fact that we live in an animal body, but we walk upright with our 'mind in the clouds'; our DNA is programmed to function via instinct, yet we prefer to assert free-will; we are smart enough to 'know better', but quite often repeat past mistakes. As such, it could be argued that the study of 'man as a paradox' is most closely aligned with our 'human essence'.

Master therapists
While the paradoxical method was documented by Adler as early as the 1920s, its counter-intuitive style has always been difficult to explain. Adler once described the method as "spitting in the patient's soup"; meaning that the method had the ability to impact behavior without "convincing or rewarding" the patient to change.

From the 1960s through the 1980s many 'master therapists' incorporated the method with great success. They include: Milton Erickson, Viktor Frankl, Jay Haley, Salvador Minuchin, Fritz Perls, and others. The method proved to have a consistent ability (as described by many for) 'amazing results' with clients who presented a wide range of disruptive behavioral issues.

Research
Unbiased research indicates that behavioral, cognitive, and psychodynamic methods show success rates that are statistically equal when working with motivated clients.
 
Paradoxical interventions were shown to have the highest success rate with oppositional and treatment-resistant clients.

Psychological research is research that psychologists perform to investigate and analyze the experiences and behaviors of individuals or groups in a systematic way. Their findings could be used in educational, occupational, and clinical settings.

Research helps us understand what causes people to think, feel, and act in certain ways; it allows us to categorize psychological disorders so that we can better understand the symptoms and their impact on individuals and society; and it allows us to better understand how intimate relationships, development, schools, family, peers, and religion all play a role.

Scientific and evidenced based
Even though the method was documented to be successful when working with treatment-resistance, paradoxical interventions lost favor in the late 1980s and '90s. This was due to the fact that the psychology field desired to present itself as science oriented, and pushed for 'evidence based' approaches. Since the underlying theory and mechanism for the paradoxical approach had remained an 'unsolved mystery', there was no way to promote the method in a concise and logical manner.

However, more recently, Eliot P. Kaplan, PhD has been able to provide a simple scientific framework that provides a grounded understanding for this seemingly complicated approach. In his work treating adolescents with problem sexual behaviors (PSB), he has been able to show that a basic orbits-gravity model allows us to unravel the puzzling nature of the approach. The model identifies the process between repetitive energy / behavior (orbits) and the strength of attachment (force of gravity) as gauged through the therapeutic alliance. The model incorporates this scientific construct to identify the 'active ingredient' that allows the method to be consistently effective in disarming and bypassing treatment resistance.

An exciting aspect of the approach is the humor and absurd quality of counter-intuitive interventions. It is often this unexpected humor that 'breaks-through' the client's usual attempts to keep the clinician at a distance and defend against treatment. Some of the better known interventions include: Prescribing the symptom; predicting behavior and outcomes; exaggerating symptomatic behavior; symptom planning and scheduling, etc.

Reverse psychology
Those who lack knowledge as to the depth of paradoxical interventions have tended to dismiss the approach simply as reverse psychology. While a paradoxical intervention and reverse psychology may seem similar on the surface, their underlying intent and direction are very different. In reverse psychology the clinician hopes to manipulate the client to follow his planned and preset agenda. (He tells the client to 'go left' with the 'plan' the client will resist his directive and 'go right'.)

However, a 'pure' paradoxical intervention seeks to only strengthen the alliance without an ulterior motive. This is done with the understanding, that by 'shifting gravity-attachment' the client will spontaneously make changes of his own desire and free-will. (Here the clinician expresses unconditional positive regard. He acknowledges that the client's habitual pattern is to 'go left', and truly accepts that the client will most likely do this pattern in the near future. However, paradoxically now that the client's behavior has been predicted and the future outcome has been accepted, the client is in a position to make a 'free-will choice' to undo the forecasted behavior.) The difference here is that paradoxical interventions support the client's ability to take responsibility for his own actions, while reverse psychology focuses on the ability of the clinician to 'trick' the client – a subtle but important difference. The advantage of the method is the ability to approach the client in a non-confrontational and non-threatening manner in such a way that it 'forces' the treatment-resistant client to take responsibility for his habitual reactions and patterns.

Reverse psychology, also known as strategic self-anticonformity, is a strategy that entails promoting a behavior that differs from the desired objective. While it can be used to control another person's conduct, it can also be used to manipulate them.

Paradoxical interventions should not be used to directly target dangerous or criminogenic behaviors. In such situations clinicians need to use strategic interventions that target secondary non-criminogenic behaviors, but as a result will impact primary targeted volatile behavior.

Reverse psychology is a persuasion strategy that involves asserting a view or conduct that is diametrically opposed to the one intended, with the hope that this approach will motivate the persuasion subject to perform what is genuinely desired.

References

Bibliography
 Adler, A. (1956).The individual psychology of Alfred Adler. (H. L. Ansbacher and R. R. Ansbacher, Ed. And Trans.) New York: Harper Row
 Ainsworth, M. D. S. (1989) Attachments beyond infancy. American Psychologist, 44, 709-716 
 Beisser, A (1970) The paradoxical theory of change. In J. Fagan and I. Shepherd (Eds.) Gestalt therapy now. New York: Harper and Row
 Bowlby, J. (1969) Attachment and loss: (Vol. 1), Attachment. New York Basic Books
 Capra, F. (1975) Tao of physics. Bantam Books 
 Fernandez, Y. M. & Serran, G. (2002) Characteristics of an effective sex offender therapist. In B. Schwartz (Eds.), The Sex Offender. (Chap. 9)
 Frank, J.D. (1973). Persuasion and healing (2nd ed.). Baltimore: Johns Hopkins University Press. 
 Frankl, V. (1965) The doctor and the soul: From psychotherapy to logotherapy. New York: Knopf
 Frankl, V.E. (1978). The unheard cry for meaning: Psychotherapy and humanism. New York: Simon & Schuster. 
 Hawking, S., (1998) A brief history of time 10th Ed. Bantam Books
 Haley, J. (1963) Strategies of psychotherapy. New York: Grune and Stratton 
 Horvath, A. O., & Goheen, M. D. (1990) Factors mediating the success of defiance- and compliance-based interventions. . Journal of Counseling Psychology, 37, 363 - 371.
 Horvath, A. O., & Symods, B.D. (1991). Relation between working alliance and outcome in psychotherapy: A meta-analysis. Journal of Counseling Psychology, 38, 139–149. 
 Kanfer, F.H., & Goldstein, A.P. (1991) Helping people change. New York: Pergamon Press 
 Kaplan, E.P. (2008) The Sex Offender - Volume 6, Chapter 4 Paradoxical Interventions with
 Treatment Resistant Offenders. Civil Research Institute (CSI) Kingston, NJ 
 Marshall, W. L. (1997). The relationship between self-esteem and deviant sexual arousal in nonfamilial child molesters. Behavior Modification, 21, 1, 86-96
 Marshall, W. L., Cripps, E., Anderson, D., & Cortoni, F. A. (1999) Self-esteem and coping strategies in child molesters. Journal of Interpersonal Violence, 14, 955-962 
 Mann R. E. & Shingler, J. (2001, September) Collaborative risk assessment with sexual offenders. Paper presented at the meeting for National Organization for the Treatment of Abusers, Cardiff, Wales.
 Orlinsky, D.E., Grawe, K. & Parks, B.K. (1994) Process and outcome in psychotherapy - Noch Einmal. In A.E. Bergin & S.L. Garfield (Eds.) Handbook of psychotherapy and behavior change (4th ed., pp. 270–378). New York: Wiley.
 Rogers, C. R. (!957). The necessary and sufficient conditions of therapeutic personality change. Journal of Consulting Psychology, 21, 95-103
 Rogers, C. R. (!975). Empathic: An unappreciated way of being. Counseling Psychologists, 5, 2-10.
 Safran, J.D. & Muran, J.C. (Eds.). (1995). The therapeutic alliance [Special issue]. Session: Psychotherapy in Practice, 1 (1). (Reissued as millennial issue, February 2000) 
 Satir, V. (1964) Conjoint Family Therapy. Palo Alto: Science and Behavior Books.
 Segal, Z. V. and Marshall, W. L. (1986) Discrepancies between self-efficacy predictions and actual performance in a population of rapists and child molesters. Cognitive Therapy and Research, 10, 363 - 376
 Seligman, M. E. (1995) The Effectiveness of Psychotherapy: The Consumer Reports Study. American Psychologist Vol. 50, Num. 12, 965 - 974
 Shoham-Salomon, V., Avner, R., & Neeman, R. (1989). You're changed if you do and changed if you don't: Mechanisms underlying paradoxical interventions. Journal of Consulting and Clinical Psychology, 57, 590 - 598.
 Ward, T., & Stewart, C. A. (2003) The treatment of sex offenders: Risk management and good lives. Professional Psychology: Research and Practice, .34, 4, 353-360
 Weakland, J., Fisch, R., Watzlawick, P., and Bodin, A. (1974) Brief therapy: Focused problem resolution. Family Process, 13, 141-168
 Weeks, G. R. and L'Abayte, L. (1982) Paradoxical psychotherapy: Theory and Practice. New York: Brunner / Mazel 
 Yalom, I.D. (1980). Existential psychotherapy. New York: Basic Books

Paradoxes
Branches of psychology